Toh Li Ying (born 2 April 1985), also known as Toh Liying, is a Singaporean former sailor, who specialized in the two-person dinghy (470) class. Together with her 17-year-old partner Deborah Ong, she was named one of the country's top sailors in the double-handed dinghy for the 2008 Summer Olympics, finishing in a distant nineteenth place. Outside her Olympic career, Toh and her previous tandem Elizabeth Ong gave the Singaporeans a sterling silver medal in the women's 470 at the 2006 Asian Games in Doha, Qatar. While pursuing to complete her degree in biomedical sciences at Monash University in Melbourne, Australia, Toh trained for the Games under the tutelage of her personal coach Craig Ferris.

Toh competed for the Singaporean sailing squad, as a skipper in the women's 470 class, at the 2008 Summer Olympics in Beijing. Building up to their Olympic selection, she and crew member Ong received a spare berth forfeited by New Zealand, as the next highest-ranked tandem vying for qualification, at the class-associated Worlds nearly eight months earlier in Melbourne. The inexperienced Singaporean duo clearly struggled to catch a vast fleet of world-class sailors under breezy conditions with marks equivalent to the fifteenth position or lower throughout the series, lying them in last overall out of 19 registered crews with 156 net points.

References

External links
 
 
 Liying Toh at NBC 2008 Olympics website
 
 

1985 births
Living people
Singaporean female sailors (sport)
Olympic sailors of Singapore
Sailors at the 2008 Summer Olympics – 470
Sailors at the 2002 Asian Games
Sailors at the 2006 Asian Games
Medalists at the 2002 Asian Games
Medalists at the 2006 Asian Games
Asian Games silver medalists for Singapore
Asian Games bronze medalists for Singapore
Asian Games medalists in sailing
21st-century Singaporean women